Sleeping Beauty Mountain Provincial Park is a provincial park in British Columbia, Canada. It is located in the watershed of the Zymagotitz River.

External links

Skeena Country
Provincial parks of British Columbia
Protected areas established in 2004
2004 establishments in British Columbia